Wen Junhui (born June 10, 1996), professionally known by his stage name Jun, is a Chinese singer, dancer, and actor based in South Korea. He is a member of the South Korean boy group Seventeen and its subunit Performance Team.  Before debuting as a member of Seventeen, Jun was a child actor who starred in multiple films including The Pye Dog (2006), for which he won the Hong Kong Film Directors' Guild's Best New Actor Silver Award, and The Legend Is Born: Ip Man (2010).

Early life
Wen Junhui was born on June 10, 1996, in Shenzhen. He has a younger brother named Fengjun who is ten years younger than him. As a child, Jun began starring in commercials at the age of two and worked as a child actor on TV shows and movies in Hong Kong and Mainland China.

Career

Early career and debut

In October 2012, Jun moved to South Korea to undergo training under Pledis Entertainment. From 2013 to 2015, he appeared on Seventeen TV and Seventeen Project: Big Debut Plan as a trainee alongside the future members of his band. He debuted as a member of Seventeen on 26 May 2015 under the stage name Jun. The group's first EP 17 Carat was released three days later, on May 29, 2015.

In 2018, Jun and group member The8 participated in the Chinese music reality show Chao Yin Zhan Ji. Jun won the first solo stage competition on the show with his performance of Wo Ming Bai, a Chinese cover of Seventeen's Thanks. He wrote the Chinese lyrics for the cover. From October to December 2018, he co-hosted the Chinese music ranking show called YO! BANG.

Solo Music
Jun released his first solo song, and the special single album Can You Sit By My Side, which he co-wrote, on December 14, 2018. In 2020, he participated in the soundtrack of The King: Eternal Monarch with the song "Dream".

His single "Crow"  made its mark on the Billboard World Digital Songs Sales chart after less than one week of its release, marking Jun's debut as a solo artist on the Billboard charts.

On 23 September 2022, Jun released his digital single "Limbo" with 2 versions in Korean and Chinese. In China, he sold 29,000 copies of the digital album containing both tracks on Tencent/QQ Music within the first week of release. The Korean version peaked at 26 on the Bugs Real-Time chart and became his first song to chart on the platform. On Melon, the track entered the daily chart for September 23 at 723, an improvement from Crow which had ranked at 948. On the Melon latest 24h (1 week) chart, Limbo Korean Ver peaked at 14.

Acting
Jun's acting career started at the age of two when he was cast in a commercial. He has appeared in numerous television series, including Flying Dragon – the Special Unit at the age of five. In 2010, he played the young Ip Man in The Legend Is Born: Ip Man.

In 2014, he was cast in the Chinese web drama Intouchable. He filmed a music video for the NetEase mobile game A Dream of Jianghu in July 2019. In October 2021, in Wuxi, China, he began filming for the Chinese web drama Exclusive Fairytale. He plays the male lead role of Ling Chao.

Personal life 

Jun learned wushu as a child and participated in competitions. Jun suffered an injury at a young age that caused him to have spinal tuberculosis. He also plays the piano and has performed arrangements of Seventeen's songs.

He is also known to fans as the "Little Prince of Shenzhen Subway" because a promotional ad he filmed for the Shenzhen Metro in middle school is still being aired on certain trains.

Discography

Singles

Soundtrack appearances

Other songs 
Released on the Chinese digital music platforms QQ Music, KuGou Music and Kuwo Music unless otherwise specified.

Songwriting credits 
Credits are adapted from the Korea Music Copyright Association unless otherwise specified.

Filmography

Film

Television series

Television shows

Music videos appearances

Awards and nominations

References

External links

 

1996 births
Living people
Chinese K-pop singers
Korean-language singers of China
Singers from Shenzhen
Chinese expatriates in South Korea
Chinese Mandopop singers
Male actors from Guangdong
21st-century Chinese male actors
Pledis Entertainment artists
Chinese child actors
Chinese wushu practitioners
21st-century Chinese male singers
Hybe Corporation artists